is a Japanese pop singer. She released her first single, "Anata no kisu o kazoemashô – You Were Mine" on September 15, 1999. This song was a huge hit in Japan and made the 17-year-old a sensation overnight. Her second album, Expansion, sold over 1.3 million copies, and it features her most biggest chart hit, "Aijo". She has done several albums (in English) of cover songs, including disco and movie standards. After a break of several years, her album Sunrise was released in March 2007.

Koyanagi was born in Saitama City, Japan to a Trinbagonian-American father and a Japanese mother. She is known for singing the English version of "Cross Colors", the ending theme of Dynasty Warriors 4. Before that, she worked with Nathan Morris and Shawn Stockman of Boyz II Men who wrote most of the songs on and produced her album Intimacy. She performed the songs in English, without understanding what she was singing.

Yuki sang the American and Japanese National Anthems during the 2006 World Baseball Classic in Tokyo. She also sang the Japanese National Anthem for an international soccer match between Japan and Trinidad & Tobago in 2006.

Discography

Albums

Studio albums

Compilation albums

Cover albums 

 FREEDOM （1999/11/25）
 Koyanagi the Covers PRODUCT 1 （2000/5/24）
 EXPANSION （2000/8/23）
 Koyanagi the Live in Japan 2000 （2001/2/28）- 2 discs
 my all… （2001/5/30）
 KOYANAGI the BALLADS 1999～2001 （2001/11/28）
 intimacy （2002/4/24）
 buddy (2002/8/21)
 KOYANAGI THE LIVE IN JAPAN 2001－2002 （2002/11/27）- 4 discs
 KOYANAGI the DISCO （2003/3/26）
 KOYANAGI the COVERS PRODUCT 2 （2003/9/25）
 Type （2003/9/25）
 Acoustic Concert at Orchard Hall （2003/11/12）- 2 discs
 MY ALL＜YUKI KOYANAGI SINGLES 1999－2003＞ （2004/1/28）- CD+DVD
 I'll Be Travelin' Home （2004/11/24）
 Sunrise （2007/3/21）
 The Best Now&Then ～10th Anniversary～ （2010/2/24）
 Prelude （2019/9/4）

Singles
 あなたのキスを数えましょう ～You were mine～ （1999/9/15）- JAP #7
 fairyland（trans@k feat. 小柳ゆき）（1999/10/27）
 あなたのキスを数えましょう Opus II（with trans@k）（Anata no Kisu o Kazoemashou) (2000/1/26）
 愛情 （Aijou) (2000/4/12）- JAP #3
 be alive （2000/7/26）
 Koyanagi the Christmas (2000/11/15）
 DEEP DEEP （2001/4/25）
 beautiful world （2001/4/25）
 my all… （2001/6/13）
 remain～心の鍵～ （remain～Kokoro no Kagi) (2001/11/21）
 HIT ON （2002/2/14）
 Endless （2002/7/10）
 Lovin' you （2002/10/17）
 ON THE RADIO （2003/3/5）
 恋のフーガ／会いたい （Koi no Fuga / Aitai) (2003/8/6）- JAP #36
 Love knot～愛の絆～ （Love Knot – Ai no Kizuna) (2004/1/28）
 Crystal Days （2004/11/24）
 最後に記憶を消して (Saigo ni Kiwoku wo Keshite) (2005/4/27）
 Fair Wind （2006/5/10）
 誓い (Chikai) (2006/10/11）
 we can go anywhere (2008/10/15) [1'669 copies sold – 2 weeks]
MacArthur Park (Donna Summer) / All at Once (2012.07.25)

Video/DVDs
 KOYANAGI THE MOVIES PRODUCT 1 (2000/09/27)
 KOYANAGI THE BUDOKAN KOYANAGI THE LIVE IN JAPAN 2000 (2001/07/11)
 KOYANAGI THE MOVIES PRODUCT 2 (2001/09/05)

References

External links 
 Yuki-Koyanagi.jp – Koyanagi Yuki's official website 
 Universal Music profile 
 Warner Music profile 
 Cross Colors lyrics in English version

1982 births
Living people
People from Saitama (city)
Japanese women pop singers
Universal Music Japan artists
Musicians from Saitama Prefecture
21st-century Japanese singers
21st-century Japanese women singers